Loose forward may refer to playing positions in both rugby football sports:

 Rugby league positions, in rugby league football
 Rugby union positions, in rugby union football